Paul Alexandre Camille Chevillard (14 October 1859 – 30 May 1923) was a French composer and conductor.

Biography
He was born in Paris. He conducted the Orchestre Lamoureux in the premieres of Claude Debussy's Nocturnes (1900 and 1901) and La mer (1905), and promoted the music of Albéric Magnard.  He was the son-in-law of the conductor Charles Lamoureux: in 1888 he married Lamoureux's daughter Marguerite.  He died in Chatou.

His pupils included Suzanne Chaigneau, Clotilde Coulombe, Sophie Carmen Eckhardt-Gramatté, Yvonne Hubert, Eugeniusz Morawski, and Robert Soetens.

Selected works
Stage
 La Rousalka, Incidental Music for the play by Édouard Schuré (1903)

Orchestral
 Ballade symphonique, Op. 6 (1889)
 Le chène et le roseau (The Oak and the Reed), Symphonic Poem after the fable by Jean de La Fontaine, Op. 7 (published 1900)
 Fantaisie symphonique, Op. 10

Chamber music
 Piano Quintet in E minor, Op. 1 (1882)
 Piano Trio, Op. 3 (1884)
 Quatre pièces (4 Pieces) for viola (or violin) and piano, Op. 4 (1887)
 Sonata for violin and piano, Op. 8 (published 1894)
 Quatre petites pièces (4 Little Pieces) for cello and piano, Op. 11 (1893)
 Sonata in B major for cello and piano, Op. 15 (1896)
 String Quartet in D major, Op. 16 (1897–98)
 Allegro for horn and piano, Op. 18 
 Introduction et marche for viola and piano, Op. 22 (published 1905)

Piano
 Thème et variations, Op. 5
 Impromptu in D major, Op. 14
 Zacharie (d'apres Michel-Ange), Op. 19
 Étude chromatique

Vocal
 Attente for mezzo-soprano or baritone and piano, Op. 12

References

External links
Biographical details
 

1859 births
1923 deaths
Musicians from Paris
Conservatoire de Paris alumni
Academic staff of the Conservatoire de Paris
French composers
French male composers
French conductors (music)
French male conductors (music)
Officiers of the Légion d'honneur
Pupils of Georges Mathias